Nayereh is a given name of Iranian origin. Notable people with the name include:

 Nayereh Ebtehaj-Samii (1914–2017), Iranian educator and politician
 Nayereh Tohidi (born 1951), Iranian-born American professor, researcher, and academic administrator

Iranian given names